was a town located in Arida District, Wakayama Prefecture, Japan.

As of 2003, the town had an estimated population of 9,405 and a density of 78.74 persons per km². The total area was 119.44 km².

On January 1, 2006, Kanaya, along with the towns of Kibi and Shimizu (all from Arida District), was merged to create the town of Aridagawa.

External links
Official town website (in Japanese)

Dissolved municipalities of Wakayama Prefecture
Aridagawa, Wakayama